The women's doubles tournament of the 2018 BWF World Championships (World Badminton Championships) took place from 30 July to 5 August.

Seeds

The seeding list is based on the World Rankings from 12 July 2018.

  Chen Qingchen / Jia Yifan (quarterfinals)
  Yuki Fukushima / Sayaka Hirota (final)
  Misaki Matsutomo / Ayaka Takahashi (third round)
  Shiho Tanaka / Koharu Yonemoto (semifinals)
  Greysia Polii / Apriyani Rahayu (semifinals)
  Lee So-hee / Shin Seung-chan (third round)
  Jongkolphan Kititharakul / Rawinda Prajongjai (quarterfinals)
  Della Destiara Haris / Rizki Amelia Pradipta (quarterfinals)

  Gabriela Stoeva / Stefani Stoeva (third round)
  Du Yue / Li Yinhui (third round)
  Mayu Matsumoto / Wakana Nagahara (champions)
  Huang Yaqiong / Yu Xiaohan (third round)
  Chow Mei Kuan / Lee Meng Yean (third round)
  Anggia Shitta Awanda / Ni Ketut Mahadewi Istarani (quarterfinals)
  Maiken Fruergaard / Sara Thygesen (third round)
  Chayanit Chaladchalam / Phataimas Muenwong (third round)

Draw

Finals

Top half

Section 1

Section 2

Bottom half

Section 3

Section 4

References

External links
Draw

2018 BWF World Championships
BWF